The trivium is the lower division of the seven liberal arts and comprises grammar, logic, and rhetoric.

Trivium may also refer to:
 Trivium (band), an American metal band from Orlando, Florida
 Trivium (demo), a 2003 demo
 Trivium (cipher), a synchronous stream cipher
 Trivium (education), in medieval educational theory
 Trivium (dance), an adjudication system for the dance style Breaking from Austria and Germany

See also
 Trivia (disambiguation)